Isaac Tshibangu Tshikuna (born 17 May 2003) is a Congolese professional footballer who plays as a winger for Turkish club Bandırmaspor and the DR Congo national team. He was included in The Guardians "Next Generation 2020".

International career
Tshibangu made his debut with the DR Congo in a 3-2 friendly loss to Rwanda on 18 September 2019.

References

External links

FDB Profile
TP Mazembe Profile

2003 births
Footballers from Kinshasa
21st-century Democratic Republic of the Congo people
Living people
Democratic Republic of the Congo footballers
Democratic Republic of the Congo international footballers
Association football wingers
TP Mazembe players
R.S.C. Anderlecht players
Bandırmaspor footballers
Linafoot players
TFF First League players
Democratic Republic of the Congo expatriate footballers
Expatriate footballers in Belgium
Democratic Republic of the Congo expatriate sportspeople in Belgium
Expatriate footballers in Turkey
Democratic Republic of the Congo expatriate sportspeople in Turkey